Azzi may refer to:

People

Surname
Arnaldo Azzi (1885–1957), Italian general and politician
Ayoub Azzi (born 1989), Algerian footballer
Christian Azzi (1926–2020), Jazz pianist
David Azzi (born 1981), Lebanese-Canadian football player
Franklin Azzi (born 1975), is a French architect
Georges Azzi (born 1979), Lebanese gay activist
Jennifer Azzi (born 1968), American women's basketball coach
Nadia Azzi (born 1998), American pianist of Lebanese-Japanese origin
Paulo Azzi (born 1994), Brazilian professional footballer
Steve Azzi, Lebanese rugby league player

Given name
Azzi Fudd (born 2002), American basketball player 
Azzi Glasser (born 1970), British perfume designer

Other uses
Azzi, a kingdom of the Hayasa-Azzi confederation in the Late Bronze Age

See also
Andrew Kazzi, Australian international rugby league footballer of Lebanese descent